Mandela Keita (born 10 May 2002) is a Belgian professional footballer who plays for Antwerp in the Belgian Pro League, on loan from OH Leuven.

Career
Keita made his debut for OH Leuven on 21 March 2021 in the away match against Mechelen.

International career
Born in Belgium, Keita is of Guinean descent. He is a youth international for Belgium, having played for the Belgium U21s.

References

External links

2002 births
Living people
Belgian footballers
Belgium under-21 international footballers
Belgian people of Guinean descent
Association football midfielders
Oud-Heverlee Leuven players
Royal Antwerp F.C. players
Belgian Pro League players